Petrova Slatina is a small village in Osijek-Baranja County, Croatia. It is part of the Šodolovci municipality and it has a population of 209 (census 2011).

See also
Šodolovci Municipality

References

Populated places in Osijek-Baranja County
Joint Council of Municipalities
Serb communities in Croatia